Scott McIntyre, Jr. (May 10, 1933 - Oct 6, 2009) was an American politician in the state of Iowa.

“Scotty” McIntyre was born in Cedar Rapids, Iowa. He worked in the insurance industry. His father John Scott McIntyre was the founder of United Fire Group, at which John Scott Jr. would later become the chairman of. 

He served in the Iowa House of Representatives from 1967 to 1979 as a Republican.

Father of two; Kaye and Kent. Husband of Dee Ann McIntyre, who is an American artist.

References

1933 births
2009 deaths
People from Cedar Rapids, Iowa
Businesspeople from Iowa
Republican Party members of the Iowa House of Representatives
20th-century American politicians
20th-century American businesspeople